The following NASCAR national series were held in 2004:

2004 NASCAR Nextel Cup Series - The top racing series in NASCAR.
2004 NASCAR Busch Series - The second-highest racing series in NASCAR.
2004 NASCAR Craftsman Truck Series - The third-highest racing series in NASCAR.

 
NASCAR seasons